Dale Patten is an American politician and former businessman serving as a member of the North Dakota Senate from the 26th district. He previously represented the 39th district.

Background 
Patten earned a Bachelor of Science degree in animal science from North Dakota State University. Prior to entering politics, he worked as a banker and served as a member of the McKenzie County Commission from 2000 to 2012. Patten has served on Natural Resources, Taxation, and Transportation committees. He was also selected to serve on the High-Level Radioactive Waste Advisory Council, a joint committee formed by legislators in North Dakota and Montana to discuss the disposal of waste material in the Bakken Formation.

Patten and his wife, Joy, have two children.

References 

Living people
Republican Party North Dakota state senators
North Dakota State University alumni
Year of birth missing (living people)
21st-century American politicians